The Breast Cancer Research Foundation (BCRF) is an independent, not-for-profit organization which has raised $569.4 million to support clinical and translational research on breast cancer at medical institutions in the United States and abroad. BCRF currently funds over 275 researchers in 15 countries.

The BCRF's director of research is Dr. Larry Norton of Memorial Sloan-Kettering Cancer Center. BCRF has funded basic research on genetic susceptibility to breast cancer, breast cancer stem cells, trastuzumab (Herceptin), anti-angiogenesis treatment with bevacizumab (Avastin), MRI imaging, aromatase inhibitors, tamoxifen; and also clinical trials of new treatments with the Translational Breast Cancer Research Consortium.

BCRF was founded in 1993 by Evelyn Lauder, Senior Corporate Vice President of The Estee Lauder Companies. Lauder's first foray into breast cancer awareness was through an initiative by herself and Alexandra Penney, former editor of SELF magazine, to make the pink ribbon an international symbol of breast cancer awareness.

Funding and spending

As of 2014, BCRF directs more than 91 cents of every dollar raised to breast cancer research and breast cancer awareness programs. BCRF has received exceptional recognition from several organizations that monitor and provide comprehensive, unbiased information on charities. CharityWatch, formerly the American Institute of Philanthropy, rated BCRF with an A grade in their November 2021 report.

References

External links
 Official website

Breast cancer organizations
Cancer charities in the United States
Organizations established in 1993
Organizations based in New York City
Charities based in New York City